Barnett is both a surname and a masculine given name. Notable people with the name include:

Surname
The Norman version of the surname likely meant 'the son of Bernard', but it could have also been derived from any of the similar sounding Gaulish names. 

 Annie Wall Barnett (1859-1942), American writer, litterateur, poet
 Blake Barnett (born 1995), American football player
 Brett Barnett, director and co-writer of webseries Shadazzle
 Charlene Barnett (1928–1979), All-American Girls Professional Baseball League player
 Charlie Barnett (disambiguation), several people
 Colin Barnett (born 1950), former Premier of Western Australia
 Correlli Barnett (born 1927), English military historian
 Courtney Barnett (born 1987), Australian singer, songwriter, and musician
 Carol Jenkins Barnett (1956–2021), American businesswoman and philanthropist
 Denis Barnett (1906–1992), British air marshal
 Derek Barnett (born 1996), American football player
 Doris Barnett, German politician (SPD)
 Errol Barnett (born 1983), American news anchor and correspondent
 Euphemia Cowan Barnett (1890–1970), Scottish botanist
 Frank Barnett (1933–2016), 49th Governor of American Samoa
 Fred Barnett (born 1960), American football player
 Gary Barnett (born 1946), American football coach
 George Barnett (1859–1930), 12th Commandant of the United States Marine Corps
 George Ezra Barnett (born 1993), British singer and songwriter
 Griff Barnett (1884–1958), American actor
 Guy Barnett (Australian politician) (born 1962)
 Guy Barnett (British politician) (1928–1986)
 Harvey Barnett (1925–1995), Australian intelligence officer
 Henrietta Barnett (WRAF officer) (1905–1985), senior officer of the Women's Royal Air Force 
 Isobel Barnett (1918–1980), Scottish radio and TV personality
 James Barnett (disambiguation), multiple people
 Janet Barnett, American mathematician
 Jay Barnett (born 2001), Australian association football player
 Joan Barnett (1945–2020), American casting director and television executive producer
 Joel Barnett (1923–2014), British politician
 John Barnett (disambiguation), multiple people
 Jordan Barnett (disambiguation), multiple people
 Josh Barnett (born 1977), American heavyweight mixed martial arts fighter
 Leon Barnett (born 1985), English football player
 Lincoln Barnett (1909–1979), American editor and writer
 Louis Barnett (1865–1946), New Zealand professor of surgery
 Louis Barnett (chocolatier) (born 1991), British chocolatier
 Mike Barnett (baseball) (born 1959), American baseball coach and replay coordinator
 Morris S. Barnett (1808–1902), American politician
 Nick Barnett (born 1981), American football player
 Phillip Barnett (born 1990), American football player
 Randy Barnett (born 1952), American libertarian legal theorist
 Rex Barnett (born 1938), American politician, and former officer of the Missouri State Highway Patrol
 Robin Barnett (born 1958), British diplomat
 Ross Barnett (1898–1987), 56th Governor of Mississippi
 Richard Barnett (disambiguation), several people
 Samuel Augustus Barnett (1844–1913), English clergyman and reformer
 Samuel Jackson Barnett (1873–1956), American physicist, discoverer of the Barnett effect
 Samuel Barnett (actor) (born 1980), English actor
 Shannie Barnett (1919–1991), American basketball player
 Stacy Barnett, victim in the murders of John Goosey and Stacy Barnett
 Stephen D. Barnett (born c. 1969), United States Navy admiral
 Steven Barnett (born 1943), American water polo player
 Steven Barnett (born 1979), Australian diver
 Thomas Barnett (disambiguation), several people
 Troy Barnett (born 1971), American football player
 Vince Barnett (1902–1977), American film actor
 William P. Barnett (born 1958), American organizational theorist
 Zoe Barnett (1883–1969), American actress

Given name
Barney Danson (1921–2011), Canadian politician and cabinet minister
Barney Frank (born 1940), American retired politician, considered the most prominent gay politician in the United States
Barnett Newman (1905–1970), American artist
Barnett Slepian (1946–1998), American physician and murder victim
Barnett Rosenberg (1926–2009), American chemist, discoverer of the anti-tumour effects of cisplatin
Barney Rosset (1922–2012), owner of the publishing house Grove Press, publisher and Editor-in-Chief of the magazine Evergreen Review

Masculine given names
English-language surnames
Surnames of English origin
Surnames of British Isles origin